Schloss Gaibach (full title: Gräflich Schönborn’sches Schloss Gaibach or Comital Schönborn Castle at Gaibach) is a castle in Gaibach, a district of the town of Volkach in Germany. Previously the residence of the counts of Schönborn, it now houses the Franken-Landschulheim Schloss Gaibach.

Bibliography 
 Georg Dehio: Handbuch der deutschen Kunstdenkmäler. Bayern I: Franken. München und Berlin: Deutscher Kunstverlag 1999.
 Gerhard Egert: Gaibach- Ein Abriss seiner Ortsgeschichte bis 1806. In: Ute Feuerbach (ed.): Unsere Mainschleife. 1978-1992. Volkach 2008.
 Victor Metzner: Kurzer Abriss der Geschichte des Franken-Landschulheims Schloss Gaibach. In: Ute Feuerbach (ed.): Volkach 906-2006. Volkach 2006.
 Walter Schilling: Die Burgen, Schlösser und Herrensitze Unterfrankens. Würzburg 2012.
 Karl Treutwein: Von Abtswind bis Zeilitzheim. Geschichtliches, Sehenswertes, Überlieferungen. Volkach 1987.
 Georg Wehner: Barockgärten in unserer Heimat: Gaibach, Werneck, Wiesentheid, Volkach und Fahr. In: Ute Feuerbach (ed.): Unsere Mainschleife. 1993-2007. Volkach 2008.

Gaibach